A pit cave, shaft cave or vertical cave—or often simply called a pit (in the US) and pothole or pot (in the UK); jama in South Slavic languages scientific and colloquial vocabulary (borrowed since early research in the Western Balkan Dinaric Alpine karst)—is a type of cave which contains one or more significant vertical shafts rather than being predominantly a conventional horizontal cave passage. Pit caves typically form in limestone as a result of long-term erosion by water. They can be open to the surface or found deep within horizontal caves. Among cavers, a pit is a vertical drop of any depth that cannot be negotiated safely without the use of ropes or ladders.

Pit caving

Techniques
Exploration into pit caves ("vertical caving", also called "potholing" in the UK and "pit caving" in US English) requires the use of equipment such as nylon kernmantle rope or cable ladders. The specialized caving techniques of single rope technique (SRT) is common practice and the preferred method of pit exploration for cavers worldwide. SRT involves the use of 8–11 mm nylon static rope and mechanical descenders/ascenders.

Vertical caving is a specialized sport that should be undertaken only after acquiring knowledge of, and expertise in, proper vertical caving equipment and its use. For obvious reasons, vertical caving is more dangerous than "horizontal caving". Vertical caving requires the intimate understanding of ropes, knots, anchors, abseiling/rappelling devices and ascending systems, and techniques for passing rebelays, and deviations, knot passes (where two ropes are joined mid-hang) and changeovers ((the act of switching from rappel to climb, or vice versa, whilst on rope). Experienced cavers typically are knowledgeable in self rescue techniques such as rigging pulley-jammers and doing pick-offs (the act of rescuing a stranded caver from his rope and returning him/her to the ground).

History

Pit caving was pioneered by the English geologist John Beaumont (c. 1650–1731) who gave an account of his descent into Lamb Leer Cavern to the Royal Society in 1681. French caver Édouard-Alfred Martel (1859–1938) first achieved the descent and exploration of the Gouffre de Padirac, France, as early as 1889 and the first complete descent of a  wet vertical shaft at Gaping Gill, in Yorkshire, England, in 1895. He developed his own techniques using ropes and metallic ladders. In the 1930s, as caving became increasingly popular in France, several clubs in the Alps developed vertical cave exploration into a recognized outdoor sport.

During World War II, a team composed by Pierre Chevalier, Fernand Petzl, Charles Petit-Didier and others explored the Dent de Crolles cave system near Grenoble, France. It became known as the deepest cave in the world at that time. The lack of available technical equipment during the war forced Chevalier and his team to innovate and develop their own. The scaling-pole (1940), nylon ropes (1942), use of explosives in caves (1947), and mechanical rope-ascenders (Henri Brenot's "monkeys", first used by Chevalier and Brenot in a cave in 1934) can be traced historically to the exploration of the Dent de Crolles cave system.

In the late 1950s, American caver Bill Cuddington, developed the single rope technique (SRT) in the United States. In 1958, two Swiss alpinists, Juesi and Marti teamed up, creating the first rope ascender, known as the Jumar. In 1968, Bruno Dressler asked Petzl, who worked as a metals machinist, to build a rope-ascending tool, today known as the Petzl Croll, which he had developed by adapting the Jumar to the specificity of pit caving. Pursuing these developments, in the 1970s Fernand Petzl started a small caving equipment manufacturing company, Petzl. Today it is a world leader in equipment for caving, mountaineering, and at-height safety in civil engineering.  The development of the rappel rack and the evolution of mechanical ascension systems, notably helped extend the practice and safety of pit exploration to a larger practice by established cavers.

Notable pit caves and underground pitches

Europe
Lamb Leer, Somerset, England, was entered by a  pitch as early as the 17th century.
Hranice Abyss, Moravia, Czech Republic, is the deepest underwater cave in the world, the lowest confirmed depth (as of 27 September 2016) is 473 m (404 m under the water level), the expected depth is 700–800 m.

United States
Stupendous Pit, Rumbling Falls Cave, Tennessee, USA, is a  pit that drops into a  chamber.
Hellhole, West Virginia, USA, has a  entrance drop and was the site of development of the single rope technique in the 1950s and '60s.

Mexico
Cenote Poza El Zacatón, Tamaulipas, Mexico, is the world's deepest cenote at

China
CCTV announced that in Shaanxi Province 49 pit caves have been found. The largest one is 500 m in diameter. The caves are in pristine condition, as they are inaccessible. They lie in mountains.

Image gallery

See also
Cenotes and Blue holes (vertical cave sinkhole filled with water)
Pit crater
Pitch (vertical space)
List of sinkholes

References

External links

Caves